Stephen Fulton may refer to:

 Stephen Fulton (boxer), professional boxer
 Stephen Fulton (politician), Nova Scotia politician